Solveig Gunbjørg Jacobsen (8 October 1913 – 25 October 1996) was a Norwegian who was the first person born and raised south of the Antarctic Convergence, in Grytviken, South Georgia in 1913.

Her father, Fridthjof Jacobsen (1874–1953), settled in South Georgia in 1904 to become assistant manager, and from 1914 to 1921 manager of the Grytviken whaling station. Two other daughters of Jacobsen's and his wife Klara Olette Jacobsen, Signe Fon (Jacobsen) and Åse Jacobsen were also born on the island. Solveig's birth was registered by the resident British Stipendiary Magistrate of South Georgia, James Wilson.

First person born in Antarctica
Solveig Gunbjørg Jacobsen was the first person born and raised south of the Antarctic Convergence, and South Georgia is usually classified as an Antarctic island and part of the Antarctic for that reason. The first human born south of the Convergence was the Australian James Kerguelen Robinson, born in Kerguelen Islands on 11 March 1859.

The Antarctic Treaty defines Antarctica as any territory located South of the 60th parallel, which excludes both South Georgia and Kerguelen. The first person born in the Antarctic Treaty area (also first on the Antarctic mainland) was Emilio Palma, born at the Argentine Esperanza Base in 1978.

Death 
She died in Buenos Aires, Argentina, aged 83, and was buried in Molde, Norway.

Legacy
Jacobsen Valley in Vinson Massif, Antarctica is named after Solveig Gunbjørg Jacobsen.

See also
 History of South Georgia and the South Sandwich Islands
 James Kerguelen Robinson

References

History of Antarctica
South Georgia and the South Sandwich Islands people
History of South Georgia
Norwegian emigrants to Argentina
1913 births
1996 deaths